Rochia magnifica is a species of sea snail, a marine gastropod mollusk in the family Tegulidae.

Description
The size of the shell varies between 13 mm and 51 mm.

Distribution
This marine shell occurs off the Philippines.

References

 Poppe G.T. (2004) Descriptions of spectacular new species from the Philippines (Gastropoda - Trochidae, Cypraeidae). Visaya 1(1): 4-19.

External links
 

magnifica
Gastropods described in 2004